The 22957 / 22958 Somnath Superfast Express is a superfast express train belonging to Indian Railways that runs between  and  in India.

It operates as train number 22957 from Ahmedabad Junction to Veraval Junction and as train number 22958 in the reverse direction.

Coaches

The 22957/22958 Somnath Superfast Express presently has 1 AC 2 tier, 2 AC 3 tier, 10 Sleeper Class & 3 General Unreserved coaches.

As with most train services in India, coach composition may be amended at the discretion of Indian Railways depending on demand.

Service

22957 Somnath Superfast Express covers the distance of 432 kilometres in 7 hours 50 mins (55 km/hr) & in 7 hours 50 mins (55 km/hr) as 22958 Somnath Superfast Express.

As the average speed of the train is around 55 km/hr, as per Indian Railways rules, its fare includes a Superfast surcharge.

Traction

It is hauled by a WDM-3A locomotive from the Ratlam or Vatva-based WDM-3D locomotive hauls the train on its entire journey.

Time Table

 22957 Somnath Superfast Express leaves Ahmedabad Junction on a daily basis at 22:10 PM IST and reaches Veraval at 06:00 AM IST on the next day.
 22958 Somnath Superfast Express leaves Veraval on a daily basis at 21:35 PM IST and reaches Ahmedabad Junction at 05:25 AM IST on the next day.

References 

Transport in Ahmedabad
Transport in Veraval
Express trains in India
Rail transport in Gujarat